The Sexton House in Goleta, California is a two-story Italianate style house that was built in 1880.  It was designed by architect Peter J. Barber.

It was listed on the U.S. National Register of Historic Places (NRHP) in 1992 as 'Joseph and Lucy Foster Sexton House.  The listing includes, in addition to the main house, four contributing structures, two objects, and one site on a  property.

Photos included with its NRHP nomination show a pentagonal pool, a built-in china cabinet, a faux marble fireplace.

The original owner, Joseph Sexton, was a horticulturist who planted trees and shrubs on the property that, in 1991, partially screened the house from busy Hollister Avenue.

The house was damaged in the 1925 Santa Barbara earthquake;  in 1926 three porches were removed.

The house was restored during 1990-91 as part of the development of a Quality Suites Inn, which is a 75-unit motor hotel.

The home still remains on the original property. Pacifica Suites Hotel was developed on the property as a hotel with 87 suites. The second floor of the home is now a one bedroom apartment that is leased out to long term corporate guests. The first floor is available for business and social functions.

References

https://npgallery.nps.gov/GetAsset/164bbb7a-f5c7-4826-8ce2-6e5581045e74

External links

Houses in Santa Barbara County, California
Goleta, California
Houses completed in 1880
Houses on the National Register of Historic Places in California
National Register of Historic Places in Santa Barbara County, California
1880 establishments in California
Italianate architecture in California
Historic districts on the National Register of Historic Places in California